Savannah Brown (born  1996) is an American poet and author.

Early life 
Brown was born in Cleveland, Ohio. She credits the poems of Edgar Allan Poe and her eleventh grade English teacher for cultivating her interest in poetry. She graduated from Wadsworth High School in 2014 then shortly after moved to London.

Career 
Brown gained prominence after videos of her performing original poems, one exploring the topic of self-love and another about female sexuality, went viral.

At age 19, Brown self-published a collection of poetry titled Gratffiti (and other poems) which was a finalist in the Goodreads Choice Awards. In 2020 she released a second poetry collection called Sweetdark. Writing about Sweetdark for i-D, Jenna Mahale notes the collection "explores how we live vulnerably, pleasurably, and chaotically at the end of the world". In Redbrick, Sam Wait states "Brown has succeeded in writing a collection that, though deeply personal, is universally relatable". Of her poetry, Brown has said "I’m interested in [...] acknowledging that so many small and human things are happening while out of frame there’s, like, a star collapsing". In Our Culture Magazine, Konstantinos Pappis describes Brown's work as having "a mix of wry self-awareness and earnest sincerity".

It was announced in 2018 that Brown had signed a two-book deal with Penguin Random House. The first book was published in 2019, a young adult thriller called The Truth About Keeping Secrets about a teenager dealing with intense grief after the sudden death of her father. Brown has said the story was inspired by her own fear of death. The book was generally well-received, a review from Kirkus citing it as a "captivatingly moody, introspective drama". Writing for Booklist, Rob Bittner says Brown's debut "will satisfy fans of mystery who yearn for a proverbial path of breadcrumbs leading to a hopeful, satisfying conclusion". Her second novel The Things We Don't See was released in 2021. Brown's novels are recognized for their LGBT protagonists.

In 2019, Brown started a 30-day poetry challenge called Escapril in which participants are tasked to write an original poem every day of April, which she still runs annually. More than 90,000 poems have been written for the event since.

Brown has also acted as a judge for the National Poetry Day competition run in collaboration with Arts Council England and The Poetry Society.

Personal life 
Brown identifies as bisexual.

Bibliography

Collections 

 Graffiti (and other poems) (2016)
 Sweetdark (2020)

Novels 

 The Truth About Keeping Secrets (Penguin Random House, 2019)
 The Things We Don't See (Penguin Random House, 2021)

References 

American LGBT poets
Bisexual women
Writers from Cleveland
1996 births
Living people
21st-century American women writers
21st-century American poets
Poets from Ohio
American women poets
American expatriates in England
American bisexual writers